Vessel of Love is a studio album by reggae musician Hollie Cook. It was released in 2018 via Merge Records.

Critical reception
Pitchfork wrote that Cook "always sounds strong and self-possessed, and that is what most makes Vessel of Love sound like pure joy." PopMatters wrote that "Cook's breezy voice soothes on backdrops of steady brass and lush synths, making for a true tropical retreat."

Track listing

Charts

References

2018 albums
albums produced by Youth (musician)
Merge Records albums